Schumaker is a surname. Notable people with the surname include:

John G. Schumaker (1826–1905), United States Representative from New York
Robert P. Schumaker, American academic and inventor of AZFinText
Skip Schumaker (born 1980), baseball player

See also
 Shoemaker (surname)
 Schumacher (surname)
 Shumaker (surname)

Occupational surnames